Carbonyl hydrido tris(triphenylphosphine)rhodium(I) [Carbonyl(hydrido)tris(triphenylphosphane)rhodium(I)] is an organorhodium compound with the formula [RhH(CO)(PPh3)3] (Ph = C6H5). It is a yellow, benzene-soluble solid, which is used industrially for hydroformylation.

Preparation
[RhH(CO)(PPh3)3] was first prepared by the reduction of [RhCl(CO)(PPh3)2], e.g. with sodium tetrahydroborate, or triethylamine and hydrogen, in ethanol in the presence of excess triphenylphosphine: 
[RhCl(CO)(PPh3)2]  +  NaBH4  +  PPh3   →   [RhH(CO)(PPh3)3]  +  NaCl  +  BH3
It can also be prepared from an aldehyde, rhodium trichloride and triphenylphosphine in basic alcoholic media.

Structure
The complex adopts a trigonal bipyramidal geometry with trans CO and hydrido ligands, resulting in pseudo-C3v symmetry. The Rh-P, Rh-C, and Rh-H distances are 2.32, 1.83, and 1.60 Å, respectively. This complex is one of a small number of stable pentacoordinate rhodium hydrides.

Use in hydroformylation
This precatalyst was uncovered in attempts to use tris(triphenylphosphine)rhodium chloride as a hydroformylation catalyst. It was found that the complex would quickly carbonylate and that the catalytic activity of the resulting material was enhanced by a variety of additives but inhibited by halides. This inhibition did not occur in the presence of base, suggesting that the hydrido-complex represented the catalytic form of the complex.

Mechanistic considerations
[RhH(CO)(PPh3)3] is a catalyst for the selective hydroformylation of 1-olefins to produce aldehydes at low pressures and mild temperatures. The selectivity for n-aldehydes increases in the presence of excess PPh3 and at low CO partial pressures. The first step in the hydroformylation process is the dissociative substitution of an alkene for a PPh3. The migratory insertion of this 18-electron complex can result in either a primary or secondary rhodium alkyl. This step sets the regiochemistry of the product, however it is rapidly reversible. The 16-electron alkyl complex undergoes migratory insertion of a CO to form the coordinately unsaturated acyl. This species once again gives an 18-electron acyl complex. The last step involves β-H elimination via hydrogenolysis which results in the cleavage of the aldehyde product and regeneration of the rhodium catalyst.

References

Rhodium(I) compounds
Catalysts
Homogeneous catalysis
Triphenylphosphine complexes
Coordination complexes
Reagents for organic chemistry